Doctor Who Unbound is a series of audio plays produced by Big Finish Productions.  Free from the constraints of continuity, the Doctor Who Unbound audios present a series of "What if...?" scenarios, and cast new actors in the role of the Doctor.

Background
In Exile, Arabella Weir plays a female incarnation of the Doctor. American alternative weekly Houston Presss Jef Rouner described her portrayal as "one of the most melancholy of all the Doctors." Other actors who played the Doctor included Geoffrey Bayldon, David Collings, Derek Jacobi, and David Warner.

Sympathy for the Devil features UNIT during the transfer of sovereignty over Hong Kong in 1997. David Warner played an alternate Third Doctor in the story, which also saw Nicholas Courtney play an alternate version of The Brigadier and Mark Gatiss play an alternate version of The Master. Warner and Courtney reprised their roles for the eighth story in the range, Masters of War. In 2016, Warner and Gatiss reprised their roles as the Doctor and the Master respectively for The New Adventures of Bernice Summerfield audio drama series: The Unbound Universe and its sequel Ruler of the Universe in 2017. After being pulled from the Unbound universe into the regular continuity of the Doctor Who universe, both characters have made ongoing appearances in various Big Finish ranges.

In February 2022, after a 14 year hiatus, Big Finish Productions announced the return of Unbound. Two boxsets, compromising of 3 stories in each, feature Colin Baker as an alternate Warrior Doctor known as "The Doctor of War" in a universe where the Fourth Doctor made the ultimate decision on Skaro, destroying the Daleks and showing how events may have unfolded after that fateful decision was made. These boxsets were announced to be released in April and September 2022 respectively.

Cast and characters

Episodes

Original series (2003–08)

Doctor of War (2022)

Reception
Den of Geeks Andrew Blair selected Doctor Who Unbound as one of the ten Doctor Who stories that would make great musicals. The Mary Sues Alan Kistler said "fans enjoyed imagining these alternate Doctors" of David Warner and Arabella Weir. American alternative weekly newspaper Houston Presss Jef Rouner said the series "fielded a fantastic set of stories."

Fandom
In 2016, BBC Americas Anglophenia featured a fan-made version of the Doctor Who theme music for Unbounds alternate Second Doctor.

References

Audio plays based on Doctor Who
Big Finish Productions
Doctor Who spin-offs